"Not My Job", a song by Flo from The Lead (2022)
 "Not My Job", a segment on NPR's radio program Wait Wait... Don't Tell Me!
 "Not My Job", a song on The Genie of the Lamp album by Mac Dre
 "It's Not My Job", an episode of Full House (season 2)